Ikhtisad (İxtisad) is a rural locality (a village) in Meneuztamaksky Selsoviet, Miyakinsky District, Bashkortostan, Russia. The population was 102 as of 2010. There is 1 street.

Geography 
Ikhtisad is located 33 km northwest of Kirgiz-Miyaki (the district's administrative centre) by road. Tukmakbash is the nearest rural locality.

References 

Rural localities in Miyakinsky District